Windsor is a small historic unincorporated community and census-designated place (CDP) located within Robbinsville Township (known as Washington Township until 2007) in Mercer County, in the U.S. state of New Jersey. The area is served as United States Postal Service ZIP Code 08561. As of the 2020 United States census, the CDP's population was 330, an increase of 104 (+46.0%) above the 226 counted at the 2010 census. The community, covering , was added to the National Register of Historic Places in 1992.

History
Earliest mention of the local area in the 17th century refers to it as a wilderness with several Native American camps.  Founded in 1818, it was named Centerville because it was the geographical center of the state.  Until then, adjacent heavily wooded lands were called Magrilla (origins unknown).

In 1814, after the completion of the Bordentown and South Amboy stagecoach turnpike, William McKnight, director of the turnpike company, built a tavern at the intersection of the turnpike and present-day Windsor-Perrineville Road.  A major thruway between New York City and Philadelphia, the turnpike was an improved route versus the Old York Road, originally the Tuckaraming Trail, a Native-American path prior to European settlement.  In 1816 the local section of the stagecoach turnpike between New York and Philadelphia ran along Main Street. In late 1831, the Camden and Amboy Railroad was constructed through Centerville.  The village became a stopover for rail travelers, and a thriving center for the bountiful farms and mills which serviced the growing population.  It quickly became the largest village between Yardville (Sand Town) and Hightstown, and was renamed "Windsor" in 1846 to avoid any confusion with a Centerville post office in Hunterdon County.

Windsor was located within its namesake, Windsor Township, until 1797, at which point Windsor Township was divided into East Windsor and West Windsor townships, with the community of Windsor located in East Windsor. East Windsor was subsequently divided in 1860, with the southern portion including Windsor becoming Washington Township (present-day Robbinsville Township).

Notable residents
People who were born in, residents of, or otherwise closely associated with Windsor include:
 Elijah C. Hutchinson (1855–1932), represented  from 1915–1923.

References

External links
 Windsor, NJ Community Association
 Livewell Church (located in the original Windsor United Methodist church)

1818 establishments in New Jersey
National Register of Historic Places in Mercer County, New Jersey
Populated places established in 1818
Robbinsville Township, New Jersey
Census-designated places in Mercer County, New Jersey
Census-designated places in New Jersey
Unincorporated communities in Mercer County, New Jersey
Unincorporated communities in New Jersey
Historic districts on the National Register of Historic Places in New Jersey